Steromphala cineraria is a species of small sea snail, a marine gastropod mollusc in the family Trochidae, the top snails.

Description 
The size of the shell varies between 12 mm and 18 mm. The thick, narrowly umbilicate, rarely imperforate shell has a conical, thick shape. It is cinereous, densely marked with numerous narrow longitudinal brown or reddish lines, or broader stripes. The 6 whorls are flattened, with 7 or 8 thread-like spiral ridges on the upper surface of the body whorl, with often one or two finer striae between each ridge, and about a dozen fine ridge-like striae on the under side. The body whorl is angulate at the periphery, somewhat convex beneath. The aperture is subrhomboidal and smooth within. The columella is straightened in the middle. The umbilicus is narrow.

Distribution
This species occurs in the North Sea, the Mediterranean Sea, and in the Atlantic Ocean (Azores, Canary Islands, Morocco).

References 

 Lowe, R. T. (1861). A list of shells observed or collected at Mogador and in its immediate environs, during a few days' visit to the place, in April 1859. i>Proceedings of the Zoological Society of London. 1860: 169-204 
 Backeljau, T. (1986). Lijst van de recente mariene mollusken van België [List of the recent marine molluscs of Belgium]. Koninklijk Belgisch Instituut voor Natuurwetenschappen: Brussels, Belgium. 106 pp.
 Gofas, S.; Le Renard, J.; Bouchet, P. (2001). Mollusca, in: Costello, M.J. et al. (Ed.) (2001). European register of marine species: a check-list of the marine species in Europe and a bibliography of guides to their identification. Collection Patrimoines Naturels, 50: pp. 180–213
 Muller, Y. (2004). Faune et flore du littoral du Nord, du Pas-de-Calais et de la Belgique: inventaire. [Coastal fauna and flora of the Nord, Pas-de-Calais and Belgium: inventory]. Commission Régionale de Biologie Région Nord Pas-de-Calais: France. 307 pp.

External links
 Linnaeus, C. (1758). Systema Naturae per regna tria naturae, secundum classes, ordines, genera, species, cum characteribus, differentiis, synonymis, locis. Editio decima, reformata [10th revised edition, vol. 1: 824 pp. Laurentius Salvius: Holmiae]
 Blainville H. M. D. de. (1828-1830). Malacozoaires ou Animaux Mollusques. [in Faune Française. Levrault, Paris 320 p., 48 pl. [livr. 18 (29 Nov. 1828), p. 1-80; livr. 20 (7 March 1829), p. 81-170; livr. 23 (1 Aug. 1829), p. 171-240; livr. 28 (3 July 1830), p. 241-320]
 Vermes. In: Gmelin J.F. (Ed.) Caroli a Linnaei Systema Naturae per Regna Tria Naturae, Ed. 13. Tome 1(6). G.E. Beer, Lipsiae [Leipzig. pp. 3021-3910]
  Thorpe C. (1844). British marine conchology; Being a descriptive catalogue, arranged according to the Lamarckian system, of the salt water shells of Great Britain. London: Edward Lumley. l + 267 pp.
 Potiez V. L. V. & Michaud A. L. G. (1838-1844). Galerie des Mollusques ou catalogue méthodique, descriptif et raisonné des Mollusques et Coquilles du Muséum de Douai. Paris, Baillière. Vol. 1: pp. 560 + XXXV [1838. Vol. 2]
 Aradas A. (1847). Descrizione delle conchiglie fossili di Gravitelli presso Messina. Atti dell'Accademia Gioenia di Scienze Naturali (2) 4: 57-88
 Jeffreys J.G. (1862-1869). British conchology. Vol. 1: pp. cxiv + 341 [1862. Vol. 2: pp. 479 [1864]. Vol. 3: pp. 394 [1865]. Vol. 4: pp. 487 [1867]. Vol. 5: pp. 259 [1869]. London, van Voorst]
 Pallary, P. (1920). Exploration scientifique du Maroc organisée par la Société de Géographie de Paris et continuée par la Société des Sciences Naturelles du Maroc. Deuxième fascicule. Malacologie. i>Larose, Rabat et Paris pp. 108. 1(1): map
 Affenzeller S., Haar N. & Steiner G. (2017). Revision of the genus complex Gibbula: an integrative approach to delineating the Eastern Mediterranean genera Gibbula Risso, 1826, Steromphala Gray, 1847, and Phorcus Risso, 1826 using DNA-barcoding and geometric morphometrics (Vetigastropoda, Trochoidea). Organisms Diversity & Evolution. 17(4): 789-812.

External links 
 

cineraria
Gastropods described in 1758
Taxa named by Carl Linnaeus
Molluscs of the Atlantic Ocean
Molluscs of the Mediterranean Sea
Molluscs of the Azores
Molluscs of the Canary Islands
Fauna of the North Sea
Invertebrates of North Africa